Tuscola is an unincorporated community in Leake County, in the U.S. state of Mississippi.

History
Tuscola is located on the former Gulf, Mobile and Ohio Railroad and was once home to a cotton gin, three large lumber mills, and two general stores.

A post office was established at Tuscola in 1872, and remained in operation until 1924. The community derives its name from the first three syllables of Tuscolameta Creek, which flows near the site.

In 1900, Tuscola had a population of 41.

References

Unincorporated communities in Mississippi
Unincorporated communities in Leake County, Mississippi
Mississippi placenames of Native American origin